Karen Harris was one of the first exclusive models for Estee Lauder, Inc., from 1962 (with Phyllis Connor) until 1971, when she was replaced by Karen Graham. As with all Lauder models prior to 1993, Victor Skrebneski photographed the ads in which Harris appeared.

References

External links 

 Estée Lauder: the line of beauty

American female models
Living people
Year of birth missing (living people)
Place of birth missing (living people)
21st-century American women